Airfan Doloh (born 26 January 2001) is a Thai professional footballer who plays as a defensive midfielder, he has also been used as a left back for Thai League 2 club Uthai Thani.

Honours

Club
Buriram United
 Thai League 1 (2): 2018, 2021–22
 Thailand Champions Cup (1): 2019

International
Thailand U23
 Southeast Asian Games  Silver medal: 2021

References

External links
 

2001 births
Living people
Airfan Doloh
Association football midfielders
Airfan Doloh
Airfan Doloh
Airfan Doloh
Airfan Doloh
Competitors at the 2021 Southeast Asian Games
Airfan Doloh